Magic Affair is a German eurodance project formed in Frankfurt, Germany in 1993 by music producer Mike Staab.  German singer Franca Morgano and American rapper Burnell Keith Herring (A.K. Swift) fronted the project in the early stages. Magic Affair is best known in Europe for the hit singles "Omen III", "Give Me All Your Love" and "In the Middle of the Night" and the album Omen (The Story Continues...). To date, the project has sold 2.5 million records in Germany and over 8 million records worldwide.

Band history

1993–94: Formation and Omen (The Story Continues...)

Magic Affair was created by producer Mike Staab as a spin-off act from the group Mysterious Art, a band in which Staab himself was a member and a producer. German singer Franca Morgano and American rapper Burnell Keith Herring (A.K. Swift) fronted the act. The first single "Omen III" was first released in 1993 under the shortened group name M.A. The single achieved success in Europe and worldwide, reaching No.1 in Germany. "Omen III" later achieved Platinum status in Germany and Gold in Austria.  The single peaked #17 in the UK Singles Chart. "Omen III" was followed in 1994 by the debut studio album Omen (The Story Continues...) and the three singles "Give Me All Your Love", "In the Middle of the Night", and "Fire", which peaked #6, #16 and #20 in the German single chart respectively. At the end of 1994, Herring was briefly replaced with Alfonso Daniel Morgan due to some internal issues between Morgano and Herring. However, Herring returned to the group shortly, and nothing was recorded with Morgan.

1995–97: Departure of Morgano and Herring and Phenomenia
In February 1995 both, Morgano and Herring were controversially fired and replaced with two female singers, Anita Davis and Jannet De Lara (Jannet Schüttler). Along with the new line-up and a new musical direction to a more pop sound including female verses and excluding male raps, Magic Affair subsequently released their first single "The Rhythm Makes You Wanna Dance" in 1995 of their upcoming second studio album. "The Rhythm Makes You Wanna Dance" was followed in 1996 by the second studio album "Phenomenia" and the two singles "Energy of Light", co-written by Daisy Dee, and "World of Freedom", which became moderate hits and peaked #37 and #15 in the Swizz and Finnish Single Chart respectively. Singer Lori Glori provides guest vocals on the album track "Magical Love Affair". 

In September 1996, Schüttler was fired and replaced by the rapper Ras-Ma-Taz (Richard Smith), previously of E-Rotic. With the third line-up, the group also appeared on the Queen tribute compilation album Queen Dance Traxx, with the song "Bohemian Rhapsody", which also saw a single release. The tribute album also featured another Queen song "We Are The Champions", recorded with all artists, who participated on Queen Dance Traxx as a supergroup labeled as "Acts United". Meanwhile, Morgano and Herring formed their own band called Blaxone and released one single "Good times" in 1996, which has been later in 2008 credited as a Magic Affair song and been included on Magic Affair's remix album series "Remixcollection I-III". In 1997, two more singles have been released, the fourth and final single of "Phenomenia", called "Break These Chains", in a different single edition with additional raps by Smith, and the new song "Night Of The Raven", being the first single released on the new Dutch label CNR and the first single for the planned but yet never materialized third studio album. "Night Of The Raven" became a minor hit, peaking #54 in the Swedish Single Chart respectively. After this release, Davis and Smith both left the band. In 1997, Herring launched his solo career.

1998–99: Single releases and hiatus
In 1998 and 1999, the promotional singles "Sacrifice", an instrumental trance track without any vocalists, and "Miracles" have been released, both without any charting success. After these single releases, Magic Affair went on hiatus. Meanwhile, Davis went on to launch her solo career, released some solo singles, and to form her girlgroup The Clarkettes, alongside singers Brenda Hale and Brooke Russell.

2004–07: Return of Morgano and brief comeback
After a short absence, Magic Affair briefly returned in 2004 with the single release "Fly Away (La Serenissima)" alongside a music video. This single also marks the return to Magic Affair of original lead singer Morgano. "Fly Away (La Serenissima)" reached #13 in German DJ Playlist and peaked #70 in the Swiss Single Chart. In 2007, former member Schüttler has been featured on guest vocals on Raul Rincon & Coronabros's single "La Verdad".

2008–12: Return of Herring and comeback
In 2008, a remix album series entitled "Remixcollection I - 1993-1994", "Remixcollection II - 1995-1996", "Remixcollection III - 1996-1998" has been digitally released, containing most remixes of the mentioned periods of that eras. Also in 2008, the single "Stigmata (Of Love)", originally an unreleased song recorded back in 2003, has been released. "Stigmata (Of Love)" marks the return to Magic Affair of original rapper Herring, but who has been only credited as a featured artist on the single as the narrator. Alongside the single, a promotional single of Magic Affair's very first hit "Omen III" has been released in 2008 with new mixes by The Nightshifterz, Pussylickerz, Dirty Boyz and Blackzone. Next to these Magic Affair releases, Morgano released her first solo album titled "Bleeding Love Songs (Italian American Songbook)". In 2009, Morgano and Herring performed "Omen III" live at RTL Ultimative Chart Show for the first time in ages. Magic Affair was working on a third studio album, produced by Mike Staab, Rainer Kempf and Bernd Waldstadt, however the project has appeared to have been cancelled due to Mike Staab's death in May 2009. In 2010, Morgano released her second studio album "You Want It" and the compilation album "Remember Me". In 2012, Morgano released her first holiday album "Christmas Part I".

2013–present: Second departure of Herring
In 2013, Herring again left Magic Affair and was replaced by German rapper Nitro, previously of hip hop collective Brothers Keepers. Meanwhile, Morgano released her third, fourth overall, and first German-language studio album ...Nach dem sturm ("...After the Storm"). In 2014, Morgano and Nitro introduced the single "Hear the Voices" along with another new song, the B-side "We're Insane". In 2022, Magic Affair released a cover of Rebel Yell by Billy Idol.

Members

Other members:
Alfonso Daniel Morgan (brief replacement for Herring in 1994, but no material had been released)

Discography

Studio albums

Remix albums
 2008: Remixcollection I - 1993-1994
 2008: Remixcollection II - 1995-1996
 2008: Remixcollection III - 1996-1998

Singles

Other songs: "Rebel Yell" (Billy Idol cover) - 2022

Promotional singles

Other appearances
1996: "We Are the Champions" (as part of the supergroup Acts United on the album Queen Dance Traxx)

Notes

References

External links

Magic Affair @ EuroKDJ
Booking: www.urbano.cz

German electronic music groups
German Eurodance groups
Musical groups established in 1994
1994 establishments in Germany
Musical groups from Frankfurt